Calectasia intermedia, commonly known as blue tinsel-lily or eastern tinsel lily is a species of flowering plant in the family Dasypogonaceae, endemic to the border areas of western Victoria and south-eastern South Australia and flowering in early spring. It is the only member of the genus Calectasia that is not endemic to Western Australia.

Description
The stems have many side branches and bear leaves with few hairs. Each leaf is about 5.7–16.8 x 0.5–0.8 mm (0.2–0.7 x 0.02–0.03 in) and tapers to a short, sharp point on the end. In the centre of the star are six yellow stamens forming a tube which turns orange-brown with age. The thin style extends beyond the stamens. Flowers appear from September to October.

Taxonomy and naming
Calectasia intermedia is one of eleven species in the genus Calectasia. It was formally described in 1856 by German botanist Otto Wilhelm Sonder, based on plant material collected by Ferdinand von Mueller in the Grampians in Victoria. The description was published in the journal Linnaea: ein Journal für die Botanik in ihrem ganzen Umfange, oder Beiträge zur Pflanzenkunde. The specific epithet (intermedia) is from the Latin intermedius "coming between", referring to its apparent intermediate appearance between C. cyanea and C. grandiflora, the only two other species recognised at the time.

Distribution and habitat
C. intermedia occurs from Bordertown in the far south-eastern corner of South Australia including the Calectasia Conservation Park, east to the Grampians and Little Desert, south-western Victoria. It grows in open Eucalyptus woodland on sandy soil and in heath. Its distribution is sporadic, due to the clearing of its habitat but it is not considered to be at risk.

References

intermedia
Flora of South Australia
Flora of Victoria (Australia)
Taxa named by Otto Wilhelm Sonder
Plants described in 1856